General elections were held in Rhodesia, renamed the year before from Southern Rhodesia, on 7 May 1965. The results was a victory for the ruling Rhodesian Front, which won 50 of the 65 seats in the Legislative Assembly of Rhodesia. Later in the year, the government made a unilateral declaration of independence (UDI).

Electoral system
The election was held using two electoral rolls, an A roll, which was largely white (95,208 whites and 2,256 black Africans) and a B roll, which was largely African. Although both rolls could vote for all 65 seats, A roll votes were given higher weighting for the 50 constituency seats, and B roll votes higher weighting for the 15 district seats.

Campaign
Two parties contested the elections; the Rhodesian Front ran in all 50 constituency seats (in 22 of which it was unopposed) but no district seats. The Rhodesia Party ran in both the constituency and district seats.

Results

References

Rhodesia
1965 in Rhodesia
Elections in Rhodesia
Rhodesia
May 1965 events in Africa